The Marathi-Konkani languages are the mainland Southern Indic languages, spoken in Maharashtra and the Konkan region of India.

Languages
The languages are: Marathi, Konkani, Phudagi, Kadodi (Samvedi), Katkari, Varli and Andh.

Several of the Marathi-Konkani languages have been variously claimed to be dialects of both Marathi and Konkani.

Maharashtrian Konkani 

A collection of dialects of Marathi-Konkani languages spoken in the Konkan region is referred to as Maharashtrian Konkani. It is often mistakenly extended to cover Goan Konkani which is an independent language. George Abraham Grierson has referred to this dialect as the Konkan Standard of Marathi in order to differentiate it from Konkani language.
The sub-dialects of Konkani gradually merge from standard Marathi into Goan Konkani from north to south Konkan. The various sub dialects are: Parabhi, Koli, Kiristanv, Kunbi, Agari, Dhangari, Thakri, Karadhi, and Maoli. These sub-dialects are together considered by the ISO to be a separate language and is assigned the ISO 639-3 code knn.
 Agari (Spoken by the Agri community found in Raigad & Thane district  of Maharashtra; Dadra and Nagar Haveli and Daman and Diu; Gujarat)
Thakri (Spoken by the Adivasi and katkari community found in Raigad district of Maharashtra)
Koli (Spoken by the Koli or fishermen community found in Mumbai, Thane, Palghar and Raigad district of Maharashtra)
 Warli (Varli) language spoken by the Warli people. Although commonly associated with Maharashtra and found in Gujarat too, Varlis (Warlis) consider the union territory of Dadra and Nagar Haveli and Daman and Diu to be their original home.

Phudagi 

Phudagi or Vadvali was primarily spoken by Vadvals, which basically means agricultural plot owners, of the Naigaon, Vasai to Dahanu region. Somavamshi Kshatriyas speak this dialect. This language is preserved mostly by the Roman Catholics native to this region, since they are a closely knit community here and have very few relatives outside this region. It was also widely spoken among the Hindus native to this region, but due to external influences, ordinary Marathi is now more popular among the Hindus. There are many songs in this language. Recently a book was published by Nutan Patil containing around 70 songs. The songs are about marriage, pachvi etc. The dialect of the Kolis (fisherfolk) of Vasai and neighbouring Mumbai resembles this dialect closely, though they speak with a heavier accent.
There is a village in Vasai called Chulna, which was predominantly Roman Catholic (now cosmopolitan).

The striking feature of the dialect here contrasting it with Phudagi, is the preference of pronouncing the thinner 'l' and 'n' ('ल' and 'न')  instead of the thicker 'l' and 'n' ('ळ' and 'ण'), which is retained even in the current generation of speakers even for conversing normal Marathi.

Samavedi 

Samavedi or Kadodi is spoken in the interiors of the Vasai-Virar region along the north of Mumbai, up to the Thane, Panvel and Uran talukas of Maharashtra. The name of this language correctly suggests that its origins lie with the Samavedi Brahmins native to this region. This language, too, finds more speakers among the Roman Catholic converts native to the region (who are sometimes known as East Indians like other local Christians of Mumbai), but nevertheless is popular among the Samavedi Brahmins. This dialect is very different from the other Marathi dialects spoken in other regions of Maharashtra, but resembles Vadvali very closely. Both Vadvali and Samavedi have relatively high proportions of words imported from Portuguese as compared to ordinary Marathi, because of direct influence of the Portuguese who colonized this region till 1739.

There is a little difference between Samvedi and Kadodi. Kado's trace their origin from Samvedi Bramhins, Goans and Portuguese due to their inter communal marriages. Christianity in Vasai dates back to the 16th century. The churches built by Portuguese in the 16th century are still being used by Christians today as well.

Official status
With the exception of Marathi and Goan Konkani, the languages have no official status. Most are considered to be a dialect of one of the larger local languages. Goan Konkani is the official language of the Indian state of Goa, Marathi of Maharashtra, and both are also among India's scheduled languages.

References

Southern Indo-Aryan languages
Konkani languages
Marathi language